Villanovia is a genus of parasitic flies in the family Tachinidae.

Species
Villanovia villicornis (Zetterstedt, 1849)

References

Dexiinae
Diptera of Europe
Taxa named by Gabriel Strobl
Tachinidae genera